Ameneon is the first full-length album by Norwegian rock band Seigmen. The album came in two editions: one on the 1:70 label and one on the Voice of Wonders label.

Track listing
"Simone" – 5:47
"Monsun" – 5:22
"Negativ" – 7:01
"Plutonium" – 4:47
"Ameneon" – 3:16
"Korsfarer" – 3:16
"Mesusah" – 9:01
"Ikon" – 2:58

Personnel
Alex Møklebust – lead vocals
Kim Ljung – bass guitar, vocals
Noralf Ronthi – drums
Marius Roth Christensen – electric guitar
Sverre Økshoff – electric guitar

References

1993 debut albums
Seigmen albums